Sara J. Zorn is the first woman in the history of the 175-year old Citadel Military College to lead the South Carolina Corps of Cadets as the regimental commander. The official ceremony in which Zorn took over the leadership, in which a gilt-handled sword was handed to her from her predecessor, Dillon Graham, took place on May 4, 2018. She has three black belts in karate Zorn's mother, who served in the United States Air Force, died when Zorn was 16 years old. Zorn won a four-year Army scholarship and will serve in the military for at least 5 years after graduation. She is from Warrenville, South Carolina, and majored in Business Administration. She attended Midland Valley High School in Aiken County, and began her studies at the Citadel in 2015.

References 

Living people
The Citadel, The Military College of South Carolina alumni
Year of birth missing (living people)